Corra Castle (also known as Corrax, Corax or Corehouse Castle) is a ruined 16th-century castle within the Corehouse Estate near New Lanark, Scotland. It overlooks Corra Linn, one of the four waterfalls which make up the Falls of Clyde. In 1967 it became a scheduled monument.

The site was chosen because it was seen as being impregnable, as it is surrounded by sharp cliffs on three sides. It features a ha-ha as part of its design, offering an unobstructed view of the surrounding countryside.

Corra Castle was at one time the residence to one of the branches of the notable family of Somerville. In his 1832 book, The Edinburgh Encyclopaedia, David Brewster wrote:

...and directly above the upper fall, stands the ruinous castle of Corra, formerly the residence of a family of the name of Somerville...

See also
Corehouse
Bonnington Pavilion
Corra Castle, Kirkgunzeon County Dumfries and Galloway

References

External links

Castles in South Lanarkshire
River Clyde
Houses completed in 1572
Listed castles in Scotland
Scheduled Ancient Monuments in South Lanarkshire
1572 establishments in Scotland